Edward King Gaylord (March 5, 1873 – May 30, 1974), often referred to as E.K. Gaylord, was the owner and publisher of the Daily Oklahoman newspaper (now The Oklahoman), as well as a radio and television entrepreneur. Born in Atchison, Kansas and educated in Colorado, he worked on several publications before moving to Oklahoma and buying an interest in the Daily Oklahoman. He built the publication into a statewide newspaper and took over its parent company in 1918.

After his death in 1974, Gaylord's family continued to have a hand in the newspaper until the publisher and parent, OPUBCO, was sold to Phil Anschutz.

Early life and career
Born on a farm in eastern Kansas and educated in Colorado, Gaylord attended Colorado College in Colorado Springs, Colorado. His older brother, Lewis, talked him into buying the Colorado Springs Telegraph and later got him to work as the business manager of the St. Joseph Dispatch in Missouri.

Oklahoma
Gaylord came to Oklahoma City, Oklahoma in December 1902 and bought an interest in the Daily Oklahoman publication that had been founded in 1889. Gaylord became the paper's business manager in January 1903. He married Inez Kinney of New York City in 1914. In 1918, he became president of the newspaper's parent company.

Gaylord built the Daily Oklahoman into a statewide newspaper, took part in the statehood movement, and was responsible for building a small experimental radio operation into the state's first major radio station, WKY. He also established the state's first television station, WKY-TV.

Gaylord died of a heart attack on May 30, 1974.

Gaylord family
His son, Edward L. Gaylord, inherited controlling interest but not complete ownership of the Daily Oklahoman and other family assets worth $50 million in 1974. Stanford University-educated in business, Edward L. increased the family fortune by a factor of forty, to two billion dollars at the time of his death in 2003. He also purchased the Grand Ole Opry in Nashville, Tennessee. He created The Nashville Network TV channel, and also Country Music Television, or CMT.

The Daily Oklahoman newspaper, later named The Oklahoman, remained owned by the Gaylord family until the 2011 sale. Although a respected newspaper during Edward King Gaylord's tenure, it became unabashedly partisan after Edward L. became its publisher; in Oklahoma some critics would satire the paper as "The Daily Disappointment," and the Columbia Journalism Review dubbed it "The Worst Newspaper in America" in 1999.

Until the 2011 sale, the paper was led by Edward L.'s daughter, publisher Christy Gaylord Everest. Everest has led a major visual modernizing of the newspaper in recent years and is assisted in the operating of the newspaper by her sister, Louise Gaylord Bennett.

The Gaylord family has frequently provided selected philanthropic contributions including major support to the National Cowboy Hall of Fame in Oklahoma City, and have given the University of Oklahoma contributions totaling over $50 million in the last three decades, resulting in a large proportion of the buildings on campus being named after one family member or another. They provided seed money for the university's Gaylord College of Journalism and Mass Communication which then constructed a new facility thanks in a large part to Gaylord donations.

References

External links
 Encyclopedia of Oklahoma History and Culture - Gaylord, Edward K.

American newspaper chain founders
Gaylord family
American centenarians
Men centenarians
1873 births
1974 deaths